Cei is a surname, and may refer to:

 Giuseppe Cei (1889–1911), Italian aviation pioneer
 Giuseppe Cei (bishop) (1640–1704), Roman Catholic prelate 
 Idilio Cei (1937–1996), Italian football goalkeeper
 Luca Cei (born 1975), Italian racing cyclist
 Pina Cei (1904–2000), Italian stage, film and television actress
 Sir Kay, in Arthurian legend

See also 
 Central European Initiative
 CEI (disambiguation)